WHRC may refer to:

 Windsor and Hantsport Railway (reporting mark WHRC)
 WHRC-LP, a low-power radio station (97.3 FM) licensed to Chippewa Falls, Wisconsin, United States
 WHRC, the student radio program of Haverford College and Bryn Mawr College, founded in 1923
 Women's Human Rights Campaign, a British organisation that opposes transgender rights